Little John is a 2001 Indian fantasy film written, executive produced and directed by Singeetam Srinivasa Rao. Bentley Mitchum and Jyothika play the lead roles with Anupam Kher, and Nassar playing supporting roles. The film released in Tamil, English, and Hindi. Pravin Mani composed the music for the project. The film opened to above average reviews and did moderate business at the box office. Despite the release of a Hindi version, the English version was dubbed into Hindi as Chota Johny in 2016.

Plot
The film opens with a historical story in which the goddess Parvathi while performing dance with her husband Lord Shiva drops her nose stud (Mookuththi in Tamil) on the Earth and because of which a temple was raised named "Mookuththi Amman temple" in Tamil Nadu. The nose stud has many powers in it and so an evil powered soul named "Kaalabhairavan" / "Kalabhairav" (Prakash Raj) waits one thousand years patiently to capture it.

John McKenzie (Bentley Mitchum), an American student from Pittsburgh comes to India to visit and research the Mookuththi Amman temple and stays in his Indian friend Vasu's home. He is received warmly by his friend's family. John visits the temple and he learns the Mookuththi history by the temple key person Swami Paramananda aka Swamiji (Anupam Kher) and a leaf which guides them to protect Mookuthi from evil powers which is visible only to him and not to John. John does not believe the story yet he believes only whatever he sees in his own eyes. Meanwhile, John develops a love for Vasu's sister Vani (Jyothika) which is disliked by Vasu's parents. Kalabhairavan wakes up from his long patience and captures the Mookuththi by one of his faithful servants by hypnotizing him. But the Mookuththi does not allow itself to go out of the temple and hides in a snake hill inside the temple. John is charged for the theft of Mookuththi and arrested by police despite Swamiji's repeated words that he did not steal it. John escapes from police custody and seeks the help of Swamiji. Swamiji throws powder on him with an intention of making him invisible but John turns to a small tiny little being.

Swamiji was arrested with the charge of concealing someone charged with a crime. John seeks Vani's help and they go to the police station with John in her pocket. Swamiji instructs him that the Mookuththi should be placed back in Amman's nose by that day's sunset else John will be 'Little John' forever. John takes away the Mookuththi from snake hill. Meanwhile, Kalabhairavan attempts to capture the Mookuththi. After several struggles between evil and divine, Mookuthithi is placed back in Amman's nose by John which destroys the evil Kalabhairavan. John gets back to his normal size and unites with Vani.

Cast

Production
In the late 1990s, director Singeetham Srinivasa Rao was asked by a producer to make a Hollywood film called Five and Half Hours to Dawn with many special effects and Rao went to Los Angeles and even engaged a casting director. But when the chance bypassed him, it led to an opportunity to make Little John which would star an American lead actor. Bentley Mitchum, an American actor best known for being the grandson of Robert Mitchum, was cast in the lead role while Jyothika was signed on to play the heroine. The American actor revealed he was surprised that he made it through his audition and had never watched an Indian film and only had read Rao's resume. The project was made as a trilingual in Tamil, Hindi, and English and was shot thrice, although the English version had no songs. The Tamil version starred Mohan Ram and Fathima Babu as Jyothika's parents while the English and Hindi versions featured Anjan Srivastav and Bharati Achrekar as her parents, respectively. Ash Chandler, an English speaking comedian of Indian descent, was also selected to play a role in the film. Prakash Raj was also roped in to play the role of Kalabhairava, revealing he had to sit before the makeup man from 5 am to get ready for a 9 am shot.

The film was produced by Media Dreams, who at the time were also producing Kamal Haasan's Pammal K. Sambandam as well as the Shankar project, Robot in 2002. Crazy Mohan, Sushma Ahuja and Mark Jaslov wrote the dialogues for the Tamil, Hindi and English versions respectively. Mitchum's voice was dubbed by playback singer, Devan Ekambaram.

Release
The film won above average reviews, with The New Straits Times wrote that the "movie is good in two aspects: its fantastic hit songs and real graphics", while about the performances the critic writes that "Mitchum is charming and likeable" and "Jyothika looks sweet with her new make-up". Another critic from LolluExpress.com also gave the film a positive verdict, praising Mitchum's performance. However, another reviewer mentioned that "it seems like a film meant for children. But then the director seems to have under-estimated the intelligence level of his targeted audience. Thiru's cinematography is a plus point for the film."

In 2006, a Telugu language version of the film was dubbed and released with Prakash Raj's character being renamed as Patala Bhairavudu.

Soundtrack

The film's music composed by Pravin Mani was critically acclaimed. The lyrics for Tamil version was written by Vairamuthu and lyrics for Hindi version was written by Javed Akhtar.

The songs of the film became an instant hit. Especially, the songs " Lady Don't Treat Me", "Baila Re Baila" and "Paadava Paadava" topped the charts. The songs "Lady Don't Treat Me" and "Baila Re Baila" were peppy numbers, while the song "Paadava Paadava" is a romantic melody rendered beautifully by the veteran singer Sujatha. This song was sung by Alka Yagnik in the Hindi version of the film. Critics praised the composition of Pravin Mani, where apunkachoice rated the album 3 out of 5 stating that, " Pravin's music is of course one of the
good points of the film. It's different
from the usual Tamil film music".

Tamil track list

Hindi track list

References

External links
 

2001 films
2000s Hindi-language films
Films about size change
Indian multilingual films
Indian fantasy films
2000s Tamil-language films
Films directed by Singeetam Srinivasa Rao
Films with screenplays by Crazy Mohan
2001 multilingual films
2001 fantasy films
2000s English-language films